Karen Hampton is an American textile designer, textile artist, and quilter. She creates works of art intended to hang on a wall, and "wearable art" including scarves and jackets. She lives in Evansville, Indiana.

Biography 
Hampton develops her own fabrics using various surface design techniques that include batik (stamping with copper tjap stamps), rozome, silk-screening, breakdown screen printing, discharging and over dyeing, and felting. She also produces fabric using a "snow" dying technique and produces digital/quilted art pieces. In addition to quilting Hampton uses a variety of sewing techniques to produce wall hangings, such as Korean pojagi patchwork.  

Hampton is an Indiana Artisan, an honorary title granted by juried artists and crafters representing the state. She is also a member of the Studio Art Quilt Associates, Surface Design Association, and the International Quilt Association.

Footnotes

External links
Indiana Artisan Profile
Surface Design Association Profile
Hampton Art Studios Profile

Quilters
Living people
People from Indiana
Year of birth missing (living people)
People from Evansville, Indiana